The Skylon Tower, in Niagara Falls, Ontario, is an observation tower that overlooks both the American Falls, New York, and the larger Horseshoe Falls, Ontario, from the Canadian side of the Niagara River.

History
Construction of the Skylon began in May 1964.  The tower was opened on October 6, 1965, by New York Governor Nelson Rockefeller and Ontario Premier John Robarts. Costing $7 million at the time of its construction, the Skylon Tower was owned by a private partnership called Niagara International Centre, which was financed by Hershey Foods shareholdings of Charles Richard Reese, former co-owner of the H. B. Reese Candy Company of Hershey, Pennsylvania. Canadian Pacific Hotels was hired to operate the tower restaurants and lounges.

On October 1, 1975, CP purchased the tower from Mr. Reese and his partners for $11 million. The tower's summit features a verdigris-green copper roof similar to CP's other properties, including the Château Frontenac in Quebec City and the Banff Springs Hotel in Banff, Alberta. CP owned and operated the tower until 1986, when it was sold for $18 million to two local Niagara hotel owners, John Gruyich of Michael's Inn and George Yerich of the Holiday Inn By The Falls Motel.  In 1988, George Yerich bought out John Gruyich's ownership share of the Skylon for $13 million, however Milicent Gruyich continues to own the land the tower is built on. Mr. Yerich's Skylon land lease will expire in 2060, at which time the Skylon Tower will revert to total ownership by the heirs of Milicent Gruyich.
 
While much redevelopment has taken place in the surrounding city, the Skylon Tower complex still retains much of its look and feel from the 1970s and 1980s. However the property has recently been expanded to include a 3D/4D Theatre, a Starbucks franchise, other quick-service franchises and a bridge connecting the complex with the newly completed Fallsview Casino. In August and September 2008 the roof of Skylon was restored to its original bright copper colour.

In recent years, the lights that shine up the tower at night have gone from being the typical white lights to a selection of colours that interchange. This is done in a similar fashion to the lights that shine on the falls themselves.

Features
Standing at 160 metres (520 ft) from street level and 236 metres (775 ft) from the bottom of the falls, the tower required approval from both Canadian and United States air transport authorities, due to its proximity to the international boundary. It was the second tower to be built using the slipform method, in which concrete is continuously poured into a form moving slowly up the tower. It was built by Pigott Construction of Hamilton, Ontario. The same methods were also used to build the Inco Superstack in Sudbury, and the CN Tower in Toronto.

The tower features three outside-mounted "Yellow Bug" elevators. At the time of their construction, they were the first such elevators in Canada. They were designed, engineered and maintained by a division of the Otis Elevator Company from Hamilton, Ontario and can carry passengers to the top of the tower in 52 seconds. Unlike conventional elevators that are guided by side rails, the Skylon elevators operate with a guide rail on the backside only. Special equipment is employed to prevent the cables from becoming tangled in the wind or impeded by snow and ice in the winter. A curtain wall on the outside of the tower behind each elevator protects the counterweight and travelling cables from the elements.

The tower has two restaurants at its top, the Revolving Dining Room and the upper Summit Suite Buffet. The Revolving Dining Room seats 276 people and revolves once every hour by resting on a circular rail that is propelled by a  motor. An observation deck sits at the tower's summit. The base of the tower features a number of gift shops, fast food restaurants and a large amusement arcade. A floor for conventions is also available, but is seldom utilized.

See also
 Googie architecture
 Tower Hotel (Niagara Falls), formerly the Konica Minolta Tower Centre
 Maid of the Mist
 Fallsview Casino
 Casino Niagara
 Clifton Hill
 List of towers
 Maple Leaf Village
 Spanish Aerocar
 Calgary Tower, a tower in Calgary, Alberta designed similar to the Skylon Tower

Images

References

External links

 
 
 Google Maps aerial photo
 Images from the Historic Niagara Digital Collections at Niagara Falls Public Library
Video: "Skylon Tower elevator ride". YouTube. April 30, 2012.
Video: "Populuxe in Niagara Falls (feat. Skylon Tower)". YouTube. August 20, 2012.

Towers completed in 1965
Observation towers in Canada
Towers in Ontario
Googie architecture
Buildings and structures in Niagara Falls, Ontario
Towers with revolving restaurants
Tourist attractions in Niagara Falls, Ontario
Modernist architecture in Canada
1965 establishments in Ontario